Neotrichoporoides beyarslani is a species of wasp in the Eulophidae family, native to Turkey. The scientific name of this species was first published in 1993 by Doganlar.

References

Eulophidae
Insects described in 1993
Hymenoptera of Asia